P. sylvestris may refer to:
 Phoenix sylvestris, the silver date palm or sugar date palm, a flowering plant species
 Pinus sylvestris, the Scots pine, a pine species native to Europe and Asia
 Podocarpus sylvestris, a conifer species found only in New Caledonia
 Pogonomys sylvestris, the gray-bellied tree mouse, a rodent species found only in Papua New Guinea

See also
 Sylvestris (disambiguation)